James Robert Rotondi (born 28 August 1962) is an American jazz trumpeter, composer, arranger, educator, and conductor.

The youngest of five siblings, Rotondi was born in Butte, Montana. He played in New York City for twenty years before moving to Austria. He has taught at the University for Music and Dramatic Arts in Graz, Austria. He has released over ten albums as a leader for Sharp Nine, Criss Cross, Posi-Tone, and Smoke Sessions Records. He has played on over eighty albums as a sideman. He has performed and recorded with  Ray Charles, Lionel Hampton, the Toshiko Akiyoshi Jazz Orchestra, Lou Donaldson, Curtis Fuller, Benny Sharoni, Eric Alexander, and George Coleman.

Rotondi has led a quintet, which features vibraphonist Joe Locke, and an electric band with David Hazeltine called Full House, which uses electronic sound on his trumpet and a variety of other electronic instruments. He is also a member of the group One for All.

In 1984, while attending North Texas State University (University of North Texas), he won first place in the International Trumpet Guild's jazz trumpet competition.

Discography

As leader
 Introducing Jim Rotondi (Criss Cross, 1997)
 Jim's Bop (Criss Cross, 1997)
 Reverence (Criss Cross, 2000)
 Excursions (Criss Cross, 2000)
 Destination Up (Sharp Nine, 2001)
 New Vistas (Criss Cross, 2004)
 The Pleasure Dome (Sharp Nine, 2004)
 Iron Man (Criss Cross, 2006)
 1000 Rainbows (Posi-Tone, 2010)
 The Move (Criss Cross, 2010)
 Live at Smalls (Smalls Live, 2010)
 Hard Hittin' at the Bird's Eye (Sharp Nine, 2013)
 Dark Blue (Smoke Sessions, 2016)

As sideman
With One for All
 Too Soon to Tell (Sharp Nine, 1997)
 Optimism (Sharp Nine, 1998)
 Upward and Onward (Criss Cross, 1999)
 What's Going On (Venus, 2000) 
 The Long Haul (Criss Cross, 2000)
 The End of a Love Affair (Venus, 2001)
 Live at Smoke Volume 1 (Criss Cross, 2001)
 Wide Horizons (Criss Cross, 2002)
 No Problem (Venus, 2003) 
 Blueslike (Criss Cross, 2004)
 Killer Joe (Venus, 2005) 
 The Lineup (Sharp Nine, 2006)
 Return of the Lineup (Sharp Nine, 2009)
 Incorrigible (Jazz Legacy, 2009)
 Invades Vancouver! (Cellar Live, 2010)
 The Third Decade (Smoke Sessions, 2016)

With Eric Alexander
 Straight Up(Delmark, 1993)
 Man with a Horn (Milestone, 1997)
 Mode for Mabes (Delmark, 1999)
 Alexander the Great (HighNote, 2000)
 The Second Milestone (Milestone, 2001)
 Temple of Olympic Zeus (HighNote, 2007)

With Charles Earland
 Blowing the Blues Away (HighNote, 1997)
 Cookin' with the Mighty Burner (HighNote, 1999)
 Live (Cannonball, 1999)

With Irene Reid
 Million Dollar Secret (Savant, 1997)
 I Ain't Doing Too Bad (Savant, 1999)
 The Uptown Lowdown (Savant, 2000)
 One Monkey Don't Stop No Show (Savant, 2002)

With others
 Toshiko Akiyoshi, Jazz Orchestra Featuring Lew Tabackin, Hiroshima Rising from the Abyss (Videoarts, 2001)
 Toshiko Akiyoshi,  Jazz Orchestra Featuring Lew Tabackin, Last Live in Blue Note Tokyo (Warner Music Japan, 2004)
 Ray Appleton, Killer Ray Rides Again (Sharp Nine, 1996)
 Paul Bollenback, Soul Grooves (Challenge, 1999)
 Ann Hampton Callaway, To Ella with Love (After 9, 1996)
 Alexis Cole, You'd Be So Nice to Come Home to (Venus, 2010)
 George Coleman, Danger High Voltage (Two and Four, 2000)
 Steve Davis, Dig Deep (Criss Cross, 1997)
 Dena DeRose, I Can See Clearly Now (Sharp Nine, 2000)
 Kyle Eastwood, Paris Blue (Candid, 2005)
 Joe Farnsworth, It's Prime Time (2003)
 Giacomo Gates, Fly Rite (Sharp Nine, 1998)
 Lionel Hampton, 90th Birthday Celebration (Sound Hills, 1999)
 David Hazeltine, How It Is (Criss Cross, 1997)
 Mike LeDonne, Then & Now (Double-Time, 1999)
 Bill Mobley, Live at Small's Vol. 1 (Space Time, 1997)
 Bill Mobley, Live at Small's Vol. 2 (Space Time, 1998)
 Meeting Point, Quintessence (Challenge, 2008)
 Bob Mintzer, Swing Out (MCG, 2008)
 One O'Clock Lab Band, Lab 85 (North Texas Lab Band, 1985)
 Cecil Payne, Chic Boom, Live at the Jazz Showcase (Delmark, 2001)
 Benny Sharoni: Slant Signature (Papaya, 2014)

References
General references

 Jim Rotondi at [ allmusic.com]
 Jim Rotondi at allaboutjazz.com
 Article on Jim Rotondi in JazzTimes

Inline citations

External links
jimrotondi.com

Eric Siereveld (Author), Brandon Coleman (Series Editor), A Modern Approach to Improvisation, Volume 2: The Improvisational Style of Jim Rotondi, 2014 (ISBN 978-1499662108)

1962 births
Living people
21st-century American male musicians
21st-century trumpeters
American jazz trumpeters
American male trumpeters
Criss Cross Jazz artists
American male jazz musicians
One for All (band) members
People from Butte, Montana
Posi-Tone Records artists
University of North Texas College of Music alumni
Smoke Sessions Records artists